The Soviet–Japanese War, known in Mongolia as the Liberation War of 1945, was a military conflict within the Second World War beginning soon after midnight on 9 August 1945, with the Soviet invasion of the Japanese puppet state of Manchukuo. The Soviets and Mongolians ended Japanese control of Manchukuo, Mengjiang (Inner Mongolia), northern Korea, Karafuto (South Sakhalin), and the Chishima Islands (Kuril Islands). The defeat of Japan's Kwantung Army helped bring about the Japanese surrender and the termination of World War II. The Soviet entry into the war was a significant factor in the Japanese government's decision to surrender unconditionally, as it was made apparent that the Soviet Union was not willing to act as a third party in negotiating an end to hostilities on conditional terms.

Summary
At the Tehran Conference in November 1943, Joseph Stalin agreed that the Soviet Union would enter the war against Japan once Germany was defeated. At the Yalta Conference in February 1945, Stalin agreed to Allied pleas to enter World War II in the Pacific Theater within three months of the end of the war in Europe. On 26 July, the US, the UK, and China made the Potsdam Declaration, an ultimatum calling for the Japanese surrender that if ignored would lead to their "prompt and utter destruction".

The commencement of the invasion fell between the US atomic bombings of Hiroshima on 6 August and Nagasaki on 9 August. Although Stalin had been told virtually nothing of the US and UK's atomic bomb program by Allied governments, the date of the invasion was foreshadowed by the Yalta agreement, the date of the German surrender, and the fact that, on 3 August, Marshal Vasilevsky reported to Stalin that, if necessary, he could attack on the morning of 5 August. The timing was well-planned and enabled the Soviet Union to enter the Pacific Theater on the side of the Allies, as previously agreed, before the war's end. The invasion of the second largest Japanese island of Hokkaido was originally planned by the Soviets to be part of the territory taken.

At 11 pm Trans-Baikal time on 8 August 1945, Soviet foreign minister Vyacheslav Molotov informed Japanese ambassador Naotake Satō that the Soviet Union had declared war on Japan, and that from 9 August the Soviet Government would consider itself to be at war with Japan. At one minute past midnight Trans-Baikal time on 9 August 1945, the Soviets commenced their invasion simultaneously on three fronts to the east, west and north of Manchuria. The operation was subdivided into smaller operational and tactical parts:
 Khingan–Mukden Offensive Operation (9 August 1945 – 2 September 1945)
 Harbin–Kirin Offensive Operation (9 August 1945 – 2 September 1945)
 Sungari Offensive Operation (9 August 1945 – 2 September 1945)
and subsequently
 South Sakhalin Operation (11 August 1945 – 25 August 1945)
 Soviet assault on Maoka (19 August 1945 – 22 August 1945)
 Seishin Landing Operation (13 August 1945 – 16 August 1945)
 Kuril Landing Operation (18 August 1945 – 1 September 1945)

Though the battle extended beyond the borders traditionally known as Manchuria – that is, the traditional lands of the Manchus – the coordinated and integrated invasions of Japan's northern territories has also been called the Battle of Manchuria. Since 1983, the operation has sometimes been called Operation August Storm, after American Army historian Lieutenant-Colonel David Glantz used this title for a paper on the subject. It has also been referred to by its Soviet name, the Manchurian Strategic Offensive Operation, but this name refers more to the Soviet invasion of Manchuria than to the whole war.

This offensive should not be confused with the Soviet–Japanese Border Wars (1932–1939) (particularly the Battle of Khalkhin Gol/Nomonhan Incident of May–September 1939), that ended in Japan's defeat in 1939, and led to the Soviet–Japanese Neutrality Pact.

Background and buildup

The Russo-Japanese War of the early 20th century resulted in a Japanese victory and the Treaty of Portsmouth by which, in conjunction with other later events including the Mukden Incident and Japanese invasion of Manchuria in September 1931, Japan eventually gained control of Korea, Manchuria and South Sakhalin. In the late 1930s were a number of Soviet-Japanese border incidents, the most significant being the Battle of Lake Khasan (Changkufeng Incident, July–August 1938) and the Battle of Khalkhin Gol (Nomonhan Incident, May–September 1939), which led to the Soviet–Japanese Neutrality Pact of April 1941. The Neutrality Pact freed up forces from the border incidents and enabled the Soviets to concentrate on their war with Germany and the Japanese to concentrate on their southern expansion into Asia and the Pacific Ocean.

With success at the Battle of Stalingrad and the eventual defeat of Germany becoming increasingly certain, the Soviet attitude to Japan changed, both publicly, with Stalin making speeches denouncing Japan, and privately, with the Soviets building up forces and supplies in the Far East. At the Tehran Conference (November 1943), Stalin, Winston Churchill, and Franklin Roosevelt agreed that the Soviet Union would enter the war against Japan once Germany was defeated. Stalin faced a dilemma since he wanted to avoid a two-front war at almost any cost but also wanted to extract gains in the Far East as well as Europe. The only way that Stalin could make Far Eastern gains without a two-front war would be for Germany to surrender before Japan.

The Soviet–Japanese Neutrality Pact caused the Soviets to make it policy to intern Allied aircrews who landed in Soviet territory after operations against Japan, but airmen held in the Soviet Union under such circumstances were usually allowed to "escape" after some period of time. Nevertheless, even before the defeat of Germany, the Soviet buildup in the Far East had steadily accelerated. By early 1945, it had become apparent to the Japanese that the Soviets were preparing to invade Manchuria, but they were unlikely to attack prior to Germany's defeat. In addition to their problems in the Pacific, the Japanese realised that they needed to determine when and where a Soviet invasion would occur.

At the Yalta Conference (February 1945), Stalin secured from Roosevelt the promise of Stalin's Far Eastern territorial desires in return for agreeing to enter the Pacific War within two or three months of the defeat of Germany. By mid-March 1945, things were not going well in the Pacific for the Japanese, who withdrew their elite troops from Manchuria to support actions in the Pacific. Meanwhile, the Soviets continued their Far Eastern buildup. The Soviets had decided that they did not wish to renew the Neutrality Pact. The Neutrality Pact required that twelve months before its expiry, the Soviets must advise the Japanese and so on 5 April 1945, they informed the Japanese that they did not wish to renew the treaty. That caused the Japanese considerable concern, but the Soviets went to great efforts to assure the Japanese that the treaty would still be in force for another twelve months and that the Japanese had nothing to worry about.

On 9 May 1945 (Moscow Time), Germany surrendered and so if the Soviets were to honour the Yalta Agreement, they would need to enter war with Japan by 9 August 1945. The situation continued to deteriorate for the Japanese, now the only Axis power left in the war. They were keen to remain at peace with the Soviets and extend the Neutrality Pact and also wanted to achieve an end to the war. Since Yalta, they had repeatedly approached or tried to approach the Soviets to extend the Neutrality Pact and to enlist the Soviets in negotiating peace with the Allies. The Soviets did nothing to discourage the Japanese hopes and drew the process out as long as possible but continued to prepare their invasion forces. One of the roles of the Cabinet of Admiral Baron Suzuki, which took office in April 1945, was to try to secure any peace terms short of unconditional surrender. In late June, they approached the Soviets (the Neutrality Pact was still in place), inviting them to negotiate peace with the Allies in support of Japan, providing them with specific proposals and in return, they offered the Soviets very attractive territorial concessions. Stalin expressed interest, and the Japanese awaited the Soviet response. The Soviets continued to avoid providing a response. The Potsdam Conference was held from 16 July to 2 August 1945. On 24 July, the Soviet Union recalled all embassy staff and families from Japan. On 26 July, the conference produced the Potsdam Declaration whereby Churchill, Harry S. Truman and Chiang Kai-shek (the Soviet Union was not officially at war with Japan) demanded the unconditional surrender of Japan. The Japanese continued to wait for the Soviet response and avoided responding to the declaration.

The Japanese had been monitoring Trans-Siberian Railway traffic and Soviet activity to the east of Manchuria and the Soviet delaying tactics, which suggested to them that the Soviets would not be ready to invade east Manchuria before the end of August. They did not have any real idea and no confirming evidence as to when or where any invasion would occur. They had estimated that an attack was not likely in August 1945 or before spring 1946, but Stavka had planned for a mid-August 1945 offensive and had concealed the buildup of a force of 90 divisions. Many had crossed Siberia in their vehicles to avoid straining the rail link.

Combatant forces

Soviets
The Far East Command, under Marshal of the Soviet Union Aleksandr Vasilevsky, had a plan for the conquest of Manchuria that was simple but huge in scale by calling for a massive pincer movement over all of Manchuria. The pincer movement was to be performed by the Transbaikal Front from the west and by the 1st Far East Front from the east. The 2nd Far East Front was to attack the center of the pocket from the north. The only Soviet equivalent of a theater command that operated during the war (apart from the short-lived 1941 "Directions" in the west), Far East Command, consisted of three Red Army fronts.

Each Front had "front units" attached directly to the front, instead of an army. The forces totaled 89 divisions with 1.5 million men, 3,704 tanks, 1,852 self propelled guns, 85,819 vehicles and 3,721 aircraft. One third of its strength was in combat support and services. Its naval forces contained 12 major surface combatants, 78 submarines, numerous amphibious craft, and the Amur River flotilla, consisting of gunboats and numerous small craft. The Soviet plan incorporated all the experience in maneuver warfare that the Soviets had acquired fighting the Germans, and also used new improved weapons, such as the RPD light machine gun, the new main battle tank T-44 and a small number of JS-3 heavy tanks.

Western Front of Manchuria
The Transbaikal Front, under Marshal Rodion Malinovsky, was to form the western half of the Soviet pincer movement and to attack across the Inner Mongolian desert and over the Greater Khingan mountains. These forces had the objective to secure Mukden (now Shenyang), then meet troops of the 1st Far East Front at the Changchun area in south-central Manchuria and so end the double envelopment.

Eastern Front of Manchuria
The 1st Far East Front, under Marshal Kirill Meretskov, was to form the eastern half of the pincer movement. The attack involved striking towards Mudanjiang (or Mutanchiang), and once that city was captured, the force was to advance towards the cities of Jilin (or Kirin), Changchun, and Harbin. Its final objective was to link up with forces of the Trans-Baikal Front at Changchun and Jilin (or Kirin) thus closing the double envelopment movement.

As a secondary objective, the 1st Far East Front was to prevent Japanese forces from escaping to Korea and to then invade the Korean Peninsula up to the 38th parallel, establishing in the process what later became North Korea.

Northern Front of Manchuria
The 2nd Far East Front, under General Purkayev, was in a supporting attack role. Its objectives were the cities of Harbin and Tsitsihar and the prevention of an orderly withdrawal to the south by Japanese forces.

Once troops from the 1st Far East Front and Trans-Baikal Front had captured the city of Changchun, the 2nd Far East Front was to attack the Liaotung Peninsula and seize Port Arthur (present day Lüshun).

Japanese
The Kwantung Army of the Imperial Japanese Army, under General Otozō Yamada, was the major part of the Japanese occupation forces in Manchuria and Korea and consisted of two Area Armies: the First Area Army (northeastern Manchukuo) and the Third Area Army (southwestern Manchukuo), as well as three independent armies (responsible for northern Manchuria, North Korea, Mengjiang, South Sakhalin, and the Kurils).

Each area army (Homen Gun, the equivalent of a Western "army") had headquarters units and units attached directly to it, in addition to the field armies (the equivalent of a Western corps). In addition was the 40,000-strong Manchukuo Defense Force, composed of eight weak, poorly-equipped, and poorly-trained Manchukuoan divisions.

The combined forces of the Kwantung Army in Manchuria and the Seventeenth Area Army in Korea came close to one million men. The two armies had no fewer than 31 divisions and 13 brigades (including two tank brigades) between them, together with numerous separate regiments and fortress units. In Manchuria alone there were approximately 700 armored vehicles and 5,000 guns and mortars (excluding 50 mm grenade dischargers), while the Japanese Air Forces had 2,004 planes in Manchuria and Korea, of which only 627 were combat types. The Imperial Japanese Navy did not contribute surface forces to the defense of Manchuria, the occupation of which it had always opposed on strategic grounds. Additionally, by the time of the invasion, the few remnants of its fleet were stationed in defense of the Japanese home islands in anticipation of a possible invasion by Western Allied forces. Despite its large size, the Kwantung Army was badly trained, poorly equipped, and had only limited supplies: overall ammunition stockpiles were sufficient to meet the needs of only 13 divisions for 3 months, compared with 24 divisions then in Manchuria. Most of its heavy equipment and all of its best troops had been transferred to the Pacific Front over the previous three years, with second-rate units raised to replace them. As a result, it had essentially been reduced to a light infantry counterinsurgency force with limited mobility or ability to fight a conventional land war against a co-ordinated enemy.

Compounding the problem, the Japanese military made many wrong assumptions and major mistakes, the two most significant the following:
 They wrongly assumed that any attack coming from the west would follow either the old rail line to Hailar or head into Solun from the eastern tip of Mongolia. The Soviets attacked along those routes, but their main attack from the west went through the supposedly-impassable Greater Khingan range south of Solun and into the center of Manchuria.
 Japanese military intelligence failed to determine the nature, location, and scale of the Soviet buildup in the Far East. Based on initial underestimates of Soviet strength and the monitoring of Soviet traffic on the Trans-Siberian Railway, the Japanese believed that the Soviets would not have sufficient forces in place before the end of August and that an attack was most likely in the autumn of 1945 or the spring of 1946.

The withdrawal of the Kwantung Army's elite forces for redeployment into the Pacific Theatre made new operational plans for the defence of Manchuria against a seemingly-inevitable Soviet attack prepared by the Japanese in the summer of 1945. They called for the redeployment of most forces from the border areas, which were to be held lightly with delaying actions. The main force was to hold the southeastern corner in strength to defend Korea from attack.

Furthermore, the Japanese had observed Soviet activity only on the Trans-Siberian Railway and along the East Manchurian front and so prepared for an invasion from the east. They believed that when an attack occurred from the west, their redeployed forces would be able to deal with it.

Although the redeployment had been initiated, it was not supposed to be completed until September and so the Kwantung Army was in the process of redeployment when the Soviets launched their attack simultaneously on all three fronts.

Campaign

The operation was carried out as a classic double pincer movement over an area the size of Western Europe. In the western pincer, the Red Army advanced over the deserts and mountains from Mongolia, far from their resupply railways. That confounded the Japanese military analysis of Soviet logistics, and the defenders were caught by surprise in unfortified positions. The Kwantung Army commanders, involved in a planning exercise at the time of the invasion, were away from their forces for the first 18 hours of conflict. Communication infrastructure was poor, and communication was lost with forward units very early. The Kwantung Army had a formidable reputation as fierce and relentless fighters, and even though weak and unprepared, they put up strong resistance in the town of Hailar, which tied down some of the Soviet forces. At the same time, Soviet airborne units were used to seize airfields and city centers in advance of the land forces and to ferry fuel to the units that had outrun their supply lines. Due to Japanese 37mm and 47mm anti-tank guns were only suitable for fighting light Soviet tanks. Japanese were decide to use suicide bomber squads strapped with grenades and explosives as their main improvised anti-tank weapon. At same time, there are some reports said Japanese Army aviation were using kamikaze planes attempt to stop Soviet advance. The Soviet pincer from the east crossed the Ussuri and advanced around Khanka Lake and attacked towards Suifenhe. Although Japanese defenders fought hard and provided strong resistance, the Soviets proved to be overwhelming.

Nevertheless, the prospect of a quick defeat to the Japanese Army seemed far from clear. Given the fanatical and sometimes suicidal resistance put up by the Japanese forces similar in April-June 1945 battle on Okinawa, there was every reason to believe that a long, difficult campaign for the capture of the last remaining Japanese fortified areas was expected. In some parts of the Soviet offensive these expectations were fully fulfilled.

After a week of fighting during which Soviet forces had penetrated deep into Manchukuo, Japanese Emperor Hirohito recorded the Gyokuon-hōsō, which was broadcast on radio to the Japanese nation on 15 August 1945. The idea of surrender was incomprehensible to the Japanese people, and combined with Hirohito's use of formal and archaic language, the fact that he did not use the word "surrender", the poor quality of the broadcast, and the poor lines of communication, there was some confusion for the Japanese about what the announcement meant. The Imperial Japanese Army Headquarters did not immediately communicate the ceasefire order to the Kwantung Army, and many elements of the Army either did not understand it or ignored it. Hence, pockets of fierce resistance from the Kwantung Army continued, and the Soviets continued their advance, largely avoiding the pockets of resistance, reaching Mukden, Changchun and Qiqihar by 20 August. On the Soviet right flank, the Soviet-Mongolian Cavalry-Mechanized Group had entered Inner Mongolia and quickly took Dolon Nur and Kalgan. The Emperor of Manchukuo and former Emperor of China, Puyi, was captured by the Soviet Red Army. The ceasefire order was eventually communicated to the Kwantung Army but not before the Soviet Union had made most of their territorial gains.

On 18 August, several Soviet amphibious landings had been conducted ahead of the land advance: three in northern Korea, one in South Sakhalin, and one in the Chishima Islands. In Korea at least, there were already Soviet soldiers waiting for the troops coming overland. In Karafuto and the Chishimas, that meant a sudden and undeniable establishment of Soviet sovereignty.

On 10 August, the US government proposed to the Soviet government to divide the occupation of Korea between them at the 38th parallel north. The Americans were surprised that the Soviet government accepted. Soviet troops were able to move freely by rail, and there was nothing to stop them from occupying the whole of Korea. Soviet forces began amphibious landings in northern Korea by 14 August and rapidly took over the northeast of the peninsula, and on 16 August, they landed at Wonsan. On 24 August, the Red Army entered Pyongyang and established a military government over Korea north of the 38th parallel. American forces landed at Incheon on 8 September and took control of the south.

Aftermath

Since the first major Japanese military defeats in the Pacific in the summer of 1942, the civilian leaders of Japan had come to realise that the Japanese military campaign was economically unsustainable, as Japan did not have the industrial capacity to fight the United States, China and the British Empire at the same time, and there were a number of initiatives to negotiate a cessation of hostilities and the consolidation of Japanese territorial and economic gains. Hence, elements of the non-military leadership had first made the decision to surrender as early as 1943. The major issue was the terms and conditions of surrender, not the issue of surrender itself. For a variety of diverse reasons, none of the initiatives was successful, the two major reasons being the Soviet Union's deception and delaying tactics and the attitudes of the "Big Six", the powerful Japanese military leaders.

The Manchurian Strategic Offensive Operation, along with the atomic bombings of Hiroshima and Nagasaki, combined to break the Japanese political deadlock and force the Japanese leaders to accept the terms of surrender demanded by the Allies.

In the "Sixty Years after Hiroshima" issue of The Weekly Standard, the American historian Richard B. Frank points out that there are a number of schools of thought with varying opinions of what caused the Japanese to surrender. He describes what he calls the "traditionalist" view, which asserts that the Japanese surrendered because the Americans dropped the atomic bombs. He goes on summarize other points of view in conflict with the traditionalist view: namely, that the Japanese government saw their situation as hopeless and was already ready to surrender before the atomic bombs – and that the Soviets went to war against Japan.

Tsuyoshi Hasegawa's research has led him to conclude that the atomic bombings were not the principal reason for Japan's capitulation. He argues that Japan's leaders were impacted more by the swift and devastating Soviet victories on the mainland in the week after Joseph Stalin's 8 August declaration of war because the Japanese strategy to protect the home islands was designed to fend off an Allied invasion from the south and left virtually no spare troops to counter a Soviet threat from the north. Furthermore, the Japanese could no longer hope to achieve a negotiated peace with the Allies by using the Soviet Union as a mediator with the Soviet declaration of war. That, according to Hasegawa, amounted to a "strategic bankruptcy" for the Japanese and forced their message of surrender on 15 August 1945. Others with similar views include the Battlefield series documentary, among others, but all, including Hasegawa, state that the surrender was not caused by only one factor or event.

The Soviet invasion and occupation of the defunct Manchukuo marked the start of a traumatic period for the more than one million residents of the puppet state who were of Japanese descent. The situation for the Japanese military occupants was clear, but the Japanese colonists who had made Manchukuo their home, particularly those born in Manchukuo, were now stateless and homeless, and the (non-Japanese) Manchurians wanted to be rid of these foreigners. Many residents were killed, and others ended up in Siberian prisons for up to 20 years. Some made their way to the Japanese home islands, where they were also treated as foreigners.

Manchuria was "cleansed" by Soviet forces of any potential military resistance. With Soviet support for the spread of communism, Manchuria provided the main base of operations for Mao Zedong's forces, who proved victorious in the following four years of the Chinese Civil War. The military successes in Manchuria and China by the Communist Chinese led to the Soviet Union giving up their rights to bases in China, promised by the Western Allies, because all of the land deemed by the Soviets to be Chinese, as distinct from what the Soviets considered to be Soviet land that had been occupied by the Japanese, was eventually turned over to the People's Republic of China. Before leaving Manchuria, Soviet forces and bureaucracy dismantled almost all of the portable parts of the considerable Japanese-built industry in Manchuria and relocated it to "restore industry in war-torn Soviet territory". What was not portable was either disabled or destroyed since the Soviets had no desire for Manchuria to be an economic rival, particularly to the underdeveloped Far Eastern Soviet Territories. After the establishment of the People's Republic of China, the bulk of the Soviet economic assistance went to Manchuria to help rebuilding the region's industry.

As agreed at Yalta, the Soviet Union had intervened in the war with Japan within three months of the German surrender and so was therefore entitled to annex the territories of South Sakhalin, which Russia had lost to Japan in aftermath of the Russo-Japanese War, and the Kuril Islands and also to preeminent interests over Port Arthur and Dalian, with its strategic rail connections, via the China Changchun Railway, a company owned jointly by China and the Soviet Union that operated all railways of the former Manchukuo. The territories on the Asian mainland were transferred to the full control of the People's Republic of China in 1955. The other possessions are still administered by the Soviet Union's successor state, Russia. The annexation of South Sakhalin and the Kuril Islands is of great importance as the Sea of Okhotsk became a Soviet inland sea, which continues to have great strategic benefit to Russia.

The division of Korea between the Soviet and US occupations led to the creation of the separate states of North and South Korea, a precursor to the Korean War five years later.

See also

 Battles of Khalkhin Gol
 Battle of Mutanchiang
 Battle of Shumshu
 Military history of Japan
 Military history of the Soviet Union
 Kuril Islands dispute
 Project Hula

Notes

References

Further reading
 Despres, J, Dzirkals, L, et al. (1976). Timely Lessons of History : The Manchurian Model for Soviet Strategy. Santa Monica, RAND: 103. (available on-line)
 Duara, P. (2006). The New Imperialism and the Post-Colonial Developmental State: Manchukuo in comparative perspective. Japan Focus.
 Garthoff, R L. (1966). Soviet Military Policy : A Historical Analysis. London, Faber and Faber.
 Garthoff, R L. (1969). The Soviet Manchurian Campaign, August 1945. Military Affairs XXXIII(Oct 1969): 312–336.
 Glantz, David M. (1983a). August Storm: The Soviet 1945 Strategic Offensive in Manchuria, Leavenworth Paper No.7, Command and General Staff College, Fort Leavenworth, Kansas, February 1983.
 Glantz, David M. (1983b). August Storm: Soviet Tactical and Operational Combat in Manchuria, 1945, Leavenworth Paper No.8, Command and General Staff College, Fort Leavenworth, Kansas, June 1983.
 Glantz, David M. (1995) The Soviet Invasion of Japan. Quarterly Journal of Military History, vol. 7, no. 3, Spring 1995.
 
 Gordin, Michael D. (2005). Five Days in August: How World War II Became a Nuclear War. (Extracts on-line)
 Hallman, A L. (1995). Battlefield Operational Functions and the Soviet Campaign against Japan in 1945. Quantico, Virginia, United States Marine Corps Command and Staff College. (available on-line)
 Hasegawa, T. (Ed.) (2007). The End of the Pacific War. (Extracts on-line)
 Ishiwatari, H, Mizumachi, K, et al. (1946) No.77 – Japanese Preparations for Operations in Manchuria (prior to 1943). Tokyo, Military History Section, Headquarters, Army Forces Far East, US Army.
 
 Phillips, S. (2004). The Sino-Japanese War, 1937–1945 : The Military Struggle – Research Guide and Bibliography. Towson University. available on-line
 USMCU CSC (1986). The Soviet Army Offensive : Manchuria, 1945. (US Marine Corps University, Command and Staff College – available on-line)

Japanese Monographs
The "Japanese Monographs" and the "Japanese Studies on Manchuria" – The 187 Japan Monographs are a series of operational histories written by former officers of the Japanese army and navy under the direction of General Headquarters of the U.S. Far East Command.
 Monographs of particular relevance to Manchuria are:
 No. 77 Japanese preparations for Operations in Manchuria (1931–1942)
 No. 78 The Kwangtung Army in the Manchurian Campaign (1941–1945) Plans and Preparations
 No. 119 Outline of Operations prior to the Termination of War and activities connected with the Cessation of Hostilities (July – August 1945)
 No. 138 Japanese preparations for Operations in Manchuria (January 1943 – August 1945)
 No. 154 Record of Operations against Soviet Russia, Eastern Front  (August 1945)
 No. 155 Record of Operations against Soviet Russia, Northern and Western Fronts (August – September 1945)
 List of the 13 Studies on Manchuria
 Vol. I Japanese Operational Planning against the USSR (1932–1945)
 Vol. II Imperial Japanese Army in Manchuria (1894–1945) Historical Summary
 Vol. III STRATEGIC STUDY ON MANCHURIA MILITARY TOPOGRAPHY AND GEOGRAPHY Terrain Study
 Vol. IV AIR OPERATIONS (1931–1945) Plans and Preparations
 Vol. V INFANTRY OPERATIONS
 Vol. VI ARMOR OPERATIONS
 Vol. VII SUPPORTING ARMS AND SERVICES
 Vol. VIII LOGISTICS IN MANCHURIA
 Vol. IX CLIMATIC FACTORS
 Vol. X Japanese Intelligence Planning against the USSR (1934–1941)
 Vol. XI Small Wars and Border Problems
 Vol. XII Anti-Bandit Operation (1931–1941)
 Vol. XIII Study of Strategic and Tactical peculiarities of Far Eastern Russia and Soviet Eastern Forces (1931–1945)

External links

 Japanese Air Order of Battle and Operations Against 'August Storm', August 1945.
 WW2DB: Operation August Storm
 Observations over Soviet Air Arm in Manchurian Strategic Offensive Operation:
 Aerial actions over Kuriles
 Soviet Order of Battle
 Soviet naval aerial kills
 Soviet side information:
 Comment over Soviet Pacific Fleet during Russian-German Conflict and Japanese forces actions in this period 
 Comment about Soviet Russian Pacific Fleet actions during Manchurian Strategic Offensive Operation 
 General information over Soviet Invasion to Japanese land in Karafuto and Kuriles from August 1945, with some photos, only in Russian language.
 Soviet battle maps:
 Soviet viewpoint map of the Manchurian Strategic Offensive Operation
 Soviet viewpoint map of Battle against Japanese fortifications in Shumushu and Paramushiro islands
 Soviet viewpoint map of Battle against Koton Japanese fortifications in way to Shikuka city, in north Karafuto area
 Japanese POWs:
 The Notes of Japanese soldier in USSR
 Operation August Storm photo gallery:
 http://ww2db.com/photo.php?source=all&color=all&list=search&foreigntype=B&foreigntype_id=167
 Japanese in Manchuria and Korea following the war

Conflicts in 1945
Pacific theatre of World War II
Battles of World War II involving Japan
Battles involving the Soviet Union
Wars involving Mongolia
1940s in Mongolia
Mongolia–Soviet Union relations
World War II operations and battles of the Pacific theatre
Invasions
Mengjiang
History of Manchuria
History of Inner Mongolia
1945 in Japan
Japan–Soviet Union relations
1945 in Mongolia
Wars involving Manchukuo
Wars involving Japan
August 1945 events in Asia
September 1945 events in Asia